Oak Ridge High School is a public high school in Orlando, Florida, established in 1959. The school had been rated a D or F institution by the state starting in 2000. In 2012, the school was awarded a C grade, breaking the low performance streak. In 2013, the school further improved and was awarded a B grade.

Campus
The Campus has been expanded/remodeled since the founding of the school. During the summer of 2010, demolition began on the northern side of campus as the 600 building and "Fish Farm", which had been the Tech Ed building, was torn down to make room for the new school.  The students are scheduled to move into the new building on a staggered schedule during the fall semester of the 2011-2012 school year.

Extracurricular activities
Activities available to Oak Ridge students include Athletic Training, AVID, Beta Club, JA Academy, Computer Programming and Gaming Club, Floetry Club, National Honor Society, AP Club, Robotics, SAFE Ambassadors, Science National Honor Society, Student Government, Yearbook, Courage Now, Youth 4 Change [Community Organizing & Social Justice] and Science Olympiad.

Marching band
The Oak Ridge Pioneer Marching Band is known as the Marching Pioneers. In the 2009 marching season, the band made state semi-finals in FMBC with their show "Spanish Fantasy", and got straight superiors in FBA. They have marched in parades including the Universal Studios Christmas Parade, the Downtown Christmas Parade and the Martin Luther King Jr. Day Parade.

Athletics
The Oak Ridge Pioneers compete in interscholastic competition in Football, Wrestling, Girls Flag Football, Bowling (Boys & Girls), Track & Field (Boys & Girls), Soccer (Boys & Girls), Baseball, Softball, Basketball (Boys & Girls), Cross Country(Boys & Girls), Swimming (Boys & Girls), and Tennis (Boys & Girls)

Oak Ridge is a charter member of the Orlando Metro Conference, in which they have competed since 1962.  During that time, the Pioneers have gone on to win a total of 79 Metro Championships:

 Boys Basketball [13] : 1981, 1983, 1984, 1985, 1989, 1990, 1991, 1998, 2014, 2016, 2017, 2018, 2019
 Girls Basketball [1] : 1975
 Boys Cross Country [4] : 1983, 1987, 1993, 1994
 Girls Cross Country [2] : 1975, 2005
 Girls Flag Football [2] : 2014, 2015
 Football [6] : 1970, 1974, 1975, 1977, 2014, 2015
 Boys Golf [1] : 1964
 Boys Soccer [3] : 1981, 1982, 2016
 Softball (Slow/Fast Pitch) [4] : 1980, 1991, 1992, 1993
 Boys Swimming [2] : 1971, 1973
 Boys Tennis [2] : 1979, 1986
 Boys Track [17] : 1976, 1977, 1978, 1980, 1981, 1982, 1983, 1984, 1985, 1987, 1988, 1991, 1992, 1993, 1994, 1995, 1996
 Girls Track [18] : 1976, 1981, 1982, 1983, 1985, 1986, 1987, 1988, 2002, 2003, 2004, 2005, 2006, 2007, 2008, 2009, 2010, 2016
 Girls Volleyball [5] : 1975, 1988, 1989, 1992, 1993
FHSAA State Championships

 Boys Basketball: 2018
 Softball(Fast Pitch): 1991
 Boys Track and Field: 1977, 1978, 1980, 1981, 1982
 Girls Track and Field: 1981, 1982, 1983, 1985, 1988, 2004, 2006, 2007, 2008

Athletic Hall of Fame 

The Oak Ridge High School Athletic Hall of Fame was created in the Spring of 2013 when 18 athletes and 2 coaches were recognized by the school at an afternoon student assembly, and in their honor banners of each individual were hung in the gymnasium hallway.  In the spring of 2014, an additional 10 individuals including 7 athletes, 2 contributors and 1 coach were inducted and honored at a school assembly followed by a banquet that evening. At the beginning of the 2014-15 school year, several individuals including past coaches, teachers and former athletes became involved with the school's administration.  As a result, a Hall of Fame Board of Directors was established and immediately began preparing for the 2015 Hall of Fame Induction.  In 2016, the Board of Directors applied for and received 501c3 status (Not for Profit).  It was at this point that the Board redefined the eligibility criteria and established a nomination, screening, validation and selection process.  In addition, the decision was made to create a permanent display honoring the Hall of Fame members.  In addition, the decision was made to create a permanent display honoring the Hall of Fame members and to locate it in the hallway of William Spoone Gymnasium.  In 2016, the Hall of Fame added a Members’ Brunch to honor the new inductees and unveiled the permanent Hall of Fame display.  The brunch and the unveiling of the permanent display for the new inductees has been add to the Hall of Fame Alumni Weekend list of events.  One other additional event will be the naming of the Hall of Fame Student-Athlete Award recipient who will be recognized and honored at the Brunch, School Assembly and at the Induction Banquet.

Curriculum
Oak Ridge is home to three district-wide magnet programs: Aviation and Aerospace Engineering, Digital Media and Gaming, and Hospitality Management.  In the spring of 2011 Oak Ridge became a certified Project Lead The Way school.

Notable alumni

David Bolender Major, US Army, Bronze Star Recipient, Iraq War Veteran
 Antonio Blakeney (born 1996), current professional basketball player for Hapoel Be'er Sheva of the Israeli Basketball Premier League
Neil Brown Jr., actor
Craig Crawford, political commentator
Michelle Finn-Burrell, former sprint athlete
Glenda Hood, Mayor of Orlando (1992–2003), Florida Secretary of State of Florida (2003–2005)
Joe Joseph, football player
Cady Lalanne, professional basketball player for the NBA's San Antonio Spurs
Barbara Pierre, track and field sprint athlete
James Rolle, sprinter
Vernice Smith, football player
Terry Reese, football player
Lavera Morris, Director of Operations for Texas Track & Field/Cross Country

City Year
In 2013, Oak Ridge brought in City Year, a national non-profit and AmeriCorps organization aimed at reducing the dropout crisis in high-needs urban schools. Ten City Year corps members sported red City Year bomber jackets and now serve as full-time tutors and mentors for 9th graders. In the 2012-13 school year 75% of those students regularly tutored by City Year mentors increased their grade in that core subject.

References

External links
Oak Ridge High School
Oak Ridge High School Athletic Hall of Fame

Educational institutions established in 1959
High schools in Orange County, Florida
Schools in Orlando, Florida
Public high schools in Florida
Magnet schools in Florida
Orange County Public Schools
1959 establishments in Florida